Tevragh-Zeina is a suburb of Nouakchott and urban commune in western Mauritania. It is the capital of Nouakchott-Ouest Region and has a population of 48,093.

The current mayor is Oumama Abdou.

The El Irvan library is located in Tevragh-Zeina. Petroleum plays a role in the economy. 

It is home to the ASC Tevragh-Zeïna football club and the College Tevragh Zeina.

References

Communes of Mauritania
Nouakchott
Regional capitals in Mauritania